Edwardsina is a genus of flies in family Blephariceridae.

Species
E. chilensis Alexander, 1920
E. fimbrata Zwick, 2006
E. fuscipes Edwards, 1929
E. gigantea Zwick, 1977
E. imperatrix Alexander, 1953
Edwardsina tasmaniensis

References 

Blephariceridae
Nematocera genera
Taxonomy articles created by Polbot